Kostantin "Kosta" Milovanović or Koka Milovanović (Serbian Cyrillic: Коkа Миловановић; Belgrade,  8 June 1847 - Belgrade,  6 May 1905) was a Serbian  general, professor at the Military Academy in Belgrade and designer of the rifle called "mauser-kokinka", lauded as one of the best rifles in the world at the end of 19th century.

Biography
Koka Milovanović was the first military envoy of the Principality of Serbia in Austria-Hungary from 1878 to 1880.

During that period Milovanović completely modified the antiquated mauser rifle and impressed upon his government to manufacture it in appreciable quantity. He was appointed too late as Chief of Staff in the  unpopular Battle of Slivnitsa on 22 November 1885 against the Bulgarians
Milovanović was elected a corresponding member of the Serbian Academic Society on 30 January 1885, but in June he declared in writing that he would not accept the election.

References

People from Belgrade
Diplomats
1847 births
1905 deaths
Austro-Hungarian Army officers
Serbian Academy of Sciences and Arts